Piche or Piché may refer to:

Surname 
Piché is a surname that may refer to:

 Alphonse Piché (1917-1998), a poet from Saguenay, Quebec, Canada
 Camille Piché (1865-1909), a lawyer and a member of Parliament of Quebec
 Laurent Piché (1985 - ), a director, screenwriter, editor, and French Canadian producer originally from Manitoba, Canada
 Lee Anthony Piché (1958-), U.S. Roman Catholic bishop, former auxiliary of St. Paul-Minneapolis, Minnesota
 Paul Piché (born in 1953), an author, songwriter, and singer from Quebec, Canada
 Paul Piché, a bishop of the Diocese of Mackenzie-Fort Smith in Northwest Territories, Canada
 Reynald Piché, born November 1929, an artist, painter and sculptor of Quebec, Canada
 Robert Piché (born 1952), a Canadian airline pilot, captain of the emergency landing of Air Transat Flight 236 in the Azores in 2001 
 Ron Piché (born 1935), former Major League Baseball player from Quebec
 Sébastien Piché (born 1988), a retired Canadian ice hockey player
 Francis J Piché Sr born 1916 Laconia NH, Ski industry Pioneer founder of Piche’s ski shop Gilford NH

Prizes 
 Piché Poetry Prize from the University of Quebec at Trois-Rivières, presented at the official opening price of the International Poetry Festival Trois-Rivières, which is responsible for its organization. This award recognizes a first work published and paid tribute to the poet Alphonse Piché.
 Marcel-Piché Prize (French: Prix Marcel-Piché), awarded since 1976 to a researcher at the Clinical Research Institute of Montreal to emphasize the quality of its work and its contribution to the advancement of Quebec's scientific community.
 Francis Piché born 1916 Laconia NH…Ski industry pioneer Founder of Piché Ski shop in Gilford NH

Works 
 Piché: Between Heaven and Earth (French: Piché — entre ciel et terre), a 2010 Canadian film directed by Sylvain Archambault; about the emergency landing of Air Transat Flight 236 Airbus A330 in the Azores in 2001, and the life of the pilot, Robert Piché

Locations 
 Piche, Guinea-Bissau, a sector in the Gabú region of Guinea-Bissau
 Val-d'Or/Rivière Piché Water Aerodrome (TC: CTA5) the Piché nautical airport

Surnames from given names